Raúl López Gutiérrez (born 17 September 1976) is a Spanish retired footballer who played as a left back.

Club career
López was born in Jerez de la Frontera, Province of Cádiz. Over the course of 14 seasons (13 complete, two separate spells) he represented Cádiz CF, being the player with most competitive games for the Andalusia side with exactly 400, 385 in league and 15 in the Copa del Rey. He appeared with them in all of the three major levels of Spanish football.

In 2005–06, López played in La Liga with his main club, featuring in 27 matches and scoring in a 1–1 home draw against Racing de Santander as the campaign eventually ended in relegation. In July 2011, aged almost 35, he left the Estadio Ramón de Carranza and resumed his career in the lower leagues and amateur football.

References

External links

Stats and bio at Cadistas1910 

1976 births
Living people
Footballers from Jerez de la Frontera
Spanish footballers
Association football defenders
La Liga players
Segunda División players
Segunda División B players
Tercera División players
Cádiz CF players
UD Melilla footballers
Racing de Ferrol footballers
San Fernando CD players
Racing Club Portuense players
Arcos CF players